is a Japanese manga series written by Hiroshi Noda and illustrated by Takahiro Wakamatsu. It was serialized on Shogakukan's Yawaraka Spirits website from January 2017 to April 2019, with its chapters collected in seven tankōbon volumes.

Publication
Written by Hiroshi Noda and illustrated by Takahiro Wakamatsu, Ningyohime no Gomen ne Gohan was serialized on Shogakukan's Yawaraka Spirits website from January 11, 2017, to April 24, 2019. Shogakukan collected its chapters in seven tankōbon volumes, released from May 12, 2017, to June 12, 2019.

Volume list

See also
No Longer Allowed In Another World, another manga series by the same authors
Love After World Domination, another manga series by the same authors

References

External links
 

2017 webcomic debuts
Cooking in anime and manga
Japanese webcomics
Mermaids in popular culture
Seinen manga
Shogakukan manga
Webcomics in print